Admiral Sir Edward William Campbell Rich Owen GCB GCH (1771 – 8 October 1849) was a Royal Navy officer who went on to be Commander-in-Chief, Mediterranean Fleet. He was the son of Captain William Owen and elder brother of Vice-Admiral William Fitzwilliam Owen.

Naval career
Owen joined the Royal Navy in 1786 under the patronage of his godfather Sir Thomas Rich.  
He served on several ships around the world. After being promoted to lieutenant in November 1793, he joined Hannibal and thereafter served with the blockading fleet off Cadiz. His loyalty during the Mutiny at the Nore in 1797 made him a captain in 1798.

In 1809 he took part in the unsuccessful Walcheren Campaign in 1809.

In 1811 he was active in the Gulf of Mexico, in 1813 he served in the North Sea and in 1814 on the Great Lakes.

He became Commander-in-Chief, West Indies in 1823 and, following promotion to rear admiral in 1825, he was appointed Surveyor-General of the Ordnance in 1827, made a member of the Lord High Admiral's Council in 1828 and was made Commander-in-Chief, East Indies Station in 1829. In this capacity he had to contend with pirates and considered the use of steam ships to pursue them. In 1845 he had command of the Experimental Squadron. In 1846 he was promoted to admiral.

He also served as Member of Parliament for Sandwich from 1826 until 1829, when he resigned from Parliament by taking the Chiltern Hundreds.

Owen Sound in Georgian Bay was named after him by his younger brother.

See also

References

Sources

External links

|-

|-

|-

1771 births
1849 deaths
Royal Navy admirals
Knights Grand Cross of the Order of the Bath
Members of the Parliament of the United Kingdom for English constituencies
UK MPs 1826–1830
Royal Navy personnel of the Napoleonic Wars
Royal Navy personnel of the French Revolutionary Wars
Lords of the Admiralty